Seventy-First Classical Middle School (SFCMS) is a middle school within the Cumberland County district. It is located at 6830 Raeford Road in Fayetteville, North Carolina. It serves students from grades 6 through 8. The school's current principal is Yardis, Todd.

History
The main building was constructed in 1924 and expanded in 1938 and 1949. It is a two-story, modified "H"-shaped Collegiate Gothic style building with a nine-bay main block flanked by two one-bay projecting wings.  The Seventy-First School was formed by the consolidation of six schools in the Seventy-First township. It was formed by the consolidation of McPherson, Glendale, Raymount, Kornbow, Westover and Galatia schools. These six schools were staffed by one to three teachers each. The two story brick school originally had 13 classrooms, an auditorium, and a privately managed lunch room. Five classrooms were used for high school work. The  first year, the school had an enrollment of 367 pupils. It served as a high school from 1924 until 1962, when it was then converted to an elementary school. The building now serves as a middle school, with the name Seventy-First Classical Middle School.

The building was listed on the National Register of Historic Places in 2004 as the Seventy-First Consolidated School. The nomination also includes several contributing buildings: the gymnasium (1951), cafeteria / classroom building (1951-1952), portable classroom (1945), and athletic field (c. 1941).

Clubs and activities
Art Club
Band
Battle of the Books
Beta Club
Chess Club
Chorus
Civic Oration
Classical Chess Team
DAR Essay Competition
FIRST LEGO League
Forensics
Quiz Bowl
Science Olympiad
Q&A

Dances
Dances are held once a month. The dances are sponsored by the teams and clubs.

Teams
Red Knights-6th grade 
Purple Knights-7th grade 
Blue Knights-8th grade

References

External links
 School Website
 Public School Review

Public middle schools in North Carolina
Schools in Cumberland County, North Carolina
Education in Fayetteville, North Carolina
Educational institutions established in 1924
1924 establishments in North Carolina
National Register of Historic Places in Cumberland County, North Carolina
School buildings on the National Register of Historic Places in North Carolina
Collegiate Gothic architecture in the United States